Regina Hopper is an American business executive, attorney and journalist.

Corporate career
Hopper is a graduate of the University of Arkansas Fulbright College with a BA degree in Political Science and the University of Arkansas/Fayetteville law school with a JD degree. She worked as an attorney and then as a special assignment reporter for the CBS and ABC affiliates in Little Rock, Arkansas. Moving to CBS News in New York, she won an Emmy for her work on the broadcast 48 Hours then moved to Washington to cover two presidential administrations for the various CBS broadcasts as well as the affiliate division Newspath.

Recognition
The Hill named Hopper on its annual list of top lobbyists. She was awarded the Gayle Pettus Pontz legal award in 2018 and a Johnson Fellow at the University of Arkansas in 2011.

References

1959 births
American television journalists
American women lawyers
American lawyers
Energy law
Energy in the United States
Living people
Miss America 1980s delegates
American women television journalists
21st-century American women